Little Johnny Jones is a 1929 American black-and-white musical film released in the United States adapted from the musical play of the same name. The film was directed by Mervyn LeRoy, who had acted in the 1923 silent version, and main character Johnny Jones was played by Edward Buzzell. The film is best known for its two Broadway classic songs from the play, "Give My Regards to Broadway" and "The Yankee Doodle Boy".

Cast
Edward Buzzell as Johnny Jones
Alice Day as Mary Baker
Edna Murphy as Vivian Dale
Robert Edeson as Ed Baker
Wheeler Oakman as Wyman
Ray Turner as Carbon (credited as Raymond Turner)
Donald Reed as Ramon
Scott McKee as Bit Part (uncredited)

Accolades
In 2004, the American Film Institute nominated the song "Give My Regards to Broadway" from this film for AFI's 100 Years...100 Songs.

References

External links

1929 films
American musical films
American black-and-white films
1920s English-language films
Films directed by Mervyn LeRoy
Films based on works by George M. Cohan
Warner Bros. films
1929 musical films
Films based on musicals
1920s American films